"Daddy's Little Girl" is a classic song typically played at white weddings while a bride dances with her father. The song's lyrics and music were first written by Robert Harrison Burke and Horace Gerlach in 1949.

Recordings
The song was recorded by British balladeer Steve Conway in 1950, and later by other artists, such as Al Martino on his 1967 Capitol Records release, Frank Fontaine on his 1963 ABC-Paramount single release, and Michael Bublé on his second album, the 2002 Canadian release, Dream. Although the Mills Brothers originally recorded the song in 1950, their 1976 re-recording was notably used in the soundtrack in the 2010 video game BioShock 2.

Lyrics
You're the end of the rainbow, my pot of gold

You're Daddy's Little Girl to have and hold

A precious gem is what you are

You're Mommy's bright and shining star.

You're the spirit of Christmas; my star on the tree

You're the Easter Bunny to Mommy and me.

You're sugar, you're spice, you're everything nice

and you're Daddy's Little Girl.

x2

In popular culture
The song was featured on an episode of Laverne & Shirley, when Scott Brady, in his role of Shirley's long-lost father Jack Feeney, sang the song to Cindy Williams' Shirley.

References
 lyrics and song by Ruth M.Reed, 1949

Pop standards
1949 songs